Haddu, was an ancient kingdom in northern Syria, identified with the modern Tell Malhat ed-Deru (تل مليحة الدور) in Deir ez-Zor Governorate.

The kingdom flourished in the middle of the third millennium BC and controlled the middle Khabur valley. It was ruled by its own monarch who was a vassal of Ebla, and fought against the kingdom of Mari. The king of Haddu declared to Mari's ambassador that he "I and Ebla have a pact of peace. And the oath of the pact is before Kura (the main Eblaite god) and before Hadda".

References

Citations

Bibliography

Further reading
 

Former populated places in Syria
Archaeological sites in Deir ez-Zor Governorate